8th NYFCCO Awards
December 15, 2008

Best Film: 
 Slumdog Millionaire 
The 8th New York Film Critics Online Awards, honoring the best in filmmaking in 2008, were given on 15 December 2008.

Top 10 films
(in alphabetical order)
Che
A Christmas Tale (Un conte de Noël)
The Curious Case of Benjamin Button
The Dark Knight
Happy-Go-Lucky
Milk
Rachel Getting Married
Slumdog Millionaire
WALL-E
The Wrestler

Winners
Best Actor:
Sean Penn – Milk as Harvey Milk
Best Actress:
Sally Hawkins – Happy-Go-Lucky as Pauline "Poppy" Cross
Best Animated Film:
WALL-E
Best Cast:
Milk
Best Cinematography
Slumdog Millionaire – Anthony Dod Mantle
Best Debut Director:
Martin McDonagh – In Bruges
Best Director:
Danny Boyle & Loveleen Tandan – Slumdog Millionaire
Best Documentary Film:
Man on Wire
Best Film:
Slumdog Millionaire
Best Film Music or Score:
Slumdog Millionaire – A. R. Rahman
Best Foreign Language Film:
4 Months, 3 Weeks and 2 Days (4 luni, 3 saptamani si 2 zile) • Romania
Best Screenplay:
Simon Beaufoy – Slumdog Millionaire
Best Supporting Actor:
Heath Ledger – The Dark Knight as The Joker posthumously
Best Supporting Actress:
Penélope Cruz – Vicky Cristina Barcelona as María Elena
Breakthrough Performer:
Sally Hawkins – Happy-Go-Lucky

References

New York Film Critics Online Awards
2008 film awards
2008 in American cinema